I'll Be Home for Christmas is a 1998 American Christmas family comedy film directed by Arlene Sanford. The plot follows a college student who must make it from his campus in Los Angeles, California to his family's home in Larchmont, New York in time for Christmas dinner in order to win his father's Porsche. It stars Jonathan Taylor Thomas, Jessica Biel, Adam LaVorgna, Sean O'Bryan and Gary Cole and was released on November 13, 1998.

Plot
College student Jake Wilkinson attends tertiary studies in a prestigious California college but has not been home to Larchmont, New York for any holidays following his biological mother's death and his father's remarriage 10 months later. A few days before Christmas Eve, his father, learning that Jake has traded in his airline ticket to New York for two tickets to Cabo San Lucas, offers to give him his vintage 1957 Porsche 356 if he arrives to their home by 6:00 PM on Christmas Eve for Christmas dinner. Jake's girlfriend Allie, who was against the trip to Cabo, agrees to ride with him to Larchmont, where her own family also lives.

Jake helps a trio of jocks cheat on their midterm exam, but their comrade, Eddie Taffet, who is Jake's nemesis and rival for Allie's affections, sabotages the scheme. Eddie and the jocks leave Jake in the desert with a Santa Claus suit, hat, and beard glued to his body. While Jake is stuck in the California desert with no way to contact Allie, she reluctantly decides to ride to New York with Eddie.

Jake has only three days to get to Larchmont if he wants the car. He stumbles upon Nolan, a simple-minded thief who is driving stolen kitchen goods to his dealer near New York. A police officer named Max pulls them over in Red Cliff, Colorado for speeding, but Jake manages to convince him that they're donating the goods to the children's hospital. Max offers to escort them to the hospital, forcing them to give away the stolen goods.

Seeing the children inspires Nolan to turn around and head west to see his wife, and Max to try to reunite with his wife Marjorie in North Platte, Nebraska. Max asks Jake to accompany him, reasoning that his wife will listen to Santa. Jake, with the help of a traveling band, gets Marjorie to take Max back, and a grateful Max buys Jake a bus ticket to New York.

Meanwhile, Allie and Eddie grow closer. Allie convinces Eddie to stay the night at a novelty hotel in a Bavarian village, the Edelbruck in Amana, Iowa. They are caught on TV underneath a sprig of mistletoe. Jake sees them kiss while he's waiting at the bus station in Nebraska and develops a scheme to convince the bus driver to drop him off at the Bavarian village. Allie explains the misunderstanding to Jake and they make up, until Jake mentions his deal with his father. Upset that Jake cares more about the car than about her, Allie storms out and takes Jake's seat on the bus.

Jake hitches a ride with Eddie until the latter is suddenly driven by jealousy and decides to throw Jake out of his car near a Wisconsin town. Reaching the town, Jake decides to enter a Santa Claus race for a chance to win the $1,000 prize to buy an airline ticket to New York. Eddie is arrested after insulting (and possibly doing more to) two police officers dressed as Christmas trees patrolling the race. While registering for the race, Jake meets a friendly local named Jeff Wilson, whom he barely beats in the race. But en route to the airport, the taxi driver informs Jake that Jeff is actually the mayor of the town; he usually wins the race every year and uses the prize money to buy food for the impoverished. Jake feels bad and gives the money to the Mayor.

Jake talks to his sister, who arranges for an airline ticket for him from Madison, Wisconsin. A staff for his intended airline doesn't allow Jake board because he has no photographic identification, so he stows away in a dog kennel on a cargo aircraft with a large dog named Ringo. From the airport he hides on a train, tries to hitch a ride in a car, then steals a one-horse open sleigh from the local parade. When he reaches his street, he apologizes to Allie and they make up. Jake rides the sleigh home, arrives at 5:59 PM, and intentionally waits until 6:00 PM to go inside so he isn't in time to get the Porsche. When his father offers it to him anyway, he refuses. He also finally accepts his stepmother. The Wilkinsons and Allie get into the sleigh just as the parade arrives and join the procession.

Cast
 Jonathan Taylor Thomas as Jake Wilkinson
 Jessica Biel as Allie Henderson
 Adam LaVorgna as Eddie Taffet
 Sean O'Bryan as Officer Max
 Gary Cole as Mr. Wilkinson
 Eve Gordon as Carolyn Wilkinson
 Lauren Maltby as Tracey Wilkinson
 Andrew Lauer as Nolan
 Lesley Boone as Marjorie

Production
In August of 1997, it was announced Jonathan Taylor Thomas was in final talks to star in a Christmas comedy film then titled I Won’t Be Home For Christmas. While the script was positioned as a vehicle for a “twentysomething” actor, Disney had the script re-written as a vehicle for Thomas as a “a Ferris Bueller-type prepschool upperclassman”.

Release

Box office 
I'll Be Home for Christmas made $3.9 million in its opening weekend, finishing at 6th at the box office. At the end of its run, the film grossed $12 million, against its $30 million budget, making it a box office bomb.

Critical reception  
The site's critical consensus says that "Neither parent nor child will find any merriment in this mess." Audiences polled by CinemaScore gave the film an average grade of "B+" on an A+ to F scale.

Roger Ebert gave the film 1 star and described the film as Pleasantville made from "anti-matter", saying the film is about "People who seem to be removed from a '50's sit-com so they can spread cliches, ancient jokes, dumb plotting and empty cheerful sanitized gimmicks into our world and time." Christopher Null called the film "surprisingly engaging" and gave it 3 out of 5 stars.

See also
 List of Christmas films

References

External links
 
 
 
 

1998 films
1990s comedy road movies
American comedy road movies
American Christmas comedy films
Walt Disney Pictures films
Films directed by Arlene Sanford
Films shot in British Columbia
Films shot in Alberta
Mandeville Films films
Films scored by John Debney
1990s Christmas comedy films
1998 comedy films
1990s English-language films
Films produced by David Hoberman
1990s American films